Vera Fischer (born 27 November 1951) is a Brazilian actress, known for acting in telenovelas, and former beauty pageant titleholder.

Early life 
Fischer was born in Blumenau, Santa Catarina, to Hildegard Berndt, a Brazilian of German descent, and Emil Fischer, a German. She was raised Protestant. According to Fischer's autobiography, her father was a Nazi and beat her.

Until age five, Fischer spoke only German; she started to learn Portuguese at school.

Career 

Fischer was crowned Miss Brazil in 1969. She was also a semi-finalist at Miss Universe 1969.

She appeared in the film A Superfêmea, a pornochanchada of 1973, and the play A Primeira Noite de Um Homem (2004), an adaptation of The Graduate by Miguel Falabella.

She has starred in telenovelas such as O Clone ("The Clone") and Laços de Família ("Family Ties").

Filmography

Television

Film

References

External links 

Vera Fischer – A Profile 
Official Miss Brazil Website 

1951 births
Living people
People from Blumenau
Brazilian people of German descent
Brazilian female models
Brazilian film actresses
Brazilian telenovela actresses
Brazilian stage actresses
Miss Universe 1969 contestants
Miss Brazil winners